Martin Andersson (born May 9, 1982) is a Swedish football player, currently a free agent.

Career 
Andersson started his career at Enköpings SK. He joined Djurgårdens IF in the beginning of 2008 together with Sebastian Rajalakso, also from Enköpings SK. He made his Allsvenskan debut against IFK Norrköping on March 30, 2008. Due to an injury in the groin, Andersson used painkillers during the spring 2008 to be able to play Djurgården's games. The injury eventually caused too much pain and Andersson did not play for much of the 2008 season. He left on loan to Vasalunds IF in 2009 and returned to Djurgården after the season. His contract with Djurgården expired in December 2010 and was not extended.

References

External links
Profile at Svenskfotboll.se 

1982 births
Living people
Swedish footballers
Association football midfielders
Allsvenskan players
Enköpings SK players
Djurgårdens IF Fotboll players
Vasalunds IF players